Shapi Magomedovitch Kaziev (27 March 1956 – 20 March 2020) was a Russian writer, playwright and script writer. Avar by ethnicity, he was the author of historical novels and other books.

Life and career
Kaziev was born in Makhachkala, in  the Dagestan ASSR, and lived in Moscow since 1974. His education in scriptwriting was with the faculty of VGIK (now known as the State Cinematography University). His cinematic debut was the screenplay of the movie Breakfast (Lenfilm). He was author of the film Rasul Gamzatov ("My Way"). He was awarded the 2003 special prize of the "Eurasian Kaleidoscope" Documentary Film Competition.

Kaziev was a productive playwright. In addition to comedies and avant garde plays, he wrote historical dramas. His first published play was the Answering machine, Modern Drama, No. 3, 1986. In 1987 his play on Imam Shamil (Captive) was published. He made his stage debut with the play Newcomer (in Moscow, 1987). His plays have been staged in Russian and foreign theaters and on the radio.

He was a member of the USSR Union of Writers since 1989.

In 1992 he founded the "Echo of the Caucasus" Publishing House in Moscow  and became its editor-in-chief (for the magazine of the same name and books on Caucasian culture and folklore).

He gained literary popularity from his book Imam Shamil in series "The Lives of Remarkable People" ("Molodaya gvardiya" Press, Moscow). Four editions have been published from 2001 to 2010.

He wrote in different genres (prose, drama, poetry, etc.). He also wrote for children.

The total circulation of his books is over 50,000 copies.
He won domestic and international literary prizes and competitions.

He was involved in civic activities in the field of international relations and participated in international academic congresses and peace projects.

List of Works 
(Russian titles in parentheses)
 Paints of exile. Novel
 Imam Shamil (Имам Шамиль) "Molodaya Gvardiya" Press. Moscow, 2001, 2003, 2006, 2010. 
 Akhoulgo. Caucasian War of 19th century (Ахульго). "Epoch", Publishing house. Makhachkala, 2008. 
 Crash of tyrant. Nadir Shah (Крах тирана). The historical novel about defeat the army of Nadir Shah in Daghestan. "Epoch", Publishing house. Makhachkala, 2009. 
 Caucasian highlanders (Повседневная жизнь горцев Северного Кавказа в XIX в.). Everyday life of the Caucasian highlanders. 19th century (In the co-authorship with I.Karpeev).  "Molodaya Gvardiya" publishers. Moscow, 2003. 
 East harem Everyday life of East harem (Повседневная жизнь восточного гарема). "Molodaya Gvardiya" publishers. Moscow, 2006. 
 East harem Collection of alive jewelry. Audio book. (Восточный гарем. Коллекция живых драгоценностей). CD сom, Moscow, 2006. ISBN АВ-МР3-436
 In paradise, travel. Plays (В раю, проездом. Книга пьес). Makhachkala, 2008. 
 Highlander's ABC Book (Горская азбука). Makhachkala, 1995. Moscow, 2002.

Awards 
 Prize of Sheikh Saud аl Babtin. 1998
 Prize of the Union of Journalists of Moscow and the Government of Moscow. 1999
 Prize "Best feathers of Russia". 1999
 Prize of the Union of journalists of Russia "For professional skill". 2001.
 Big literary prize it. Rasul Gamzatov. 2008.
 Prize "Best books of year". 2009.

References

External links
 Shapi Kaziev’s new books about Caucasus
 Panorama of Russia
 Center for Interethnic Cooperation
 Shapi Kaziev's site.

1956 births
2020 deaths
People from Makhachkala
Avar people
Russian dramatists and playwrights
Russian male dramatists and playwrights
Russian male novelists
Russian historical novelists